The 2003 Prime Minister's Cup was the inaugural national football cup competition in Laos. The competition was won by MCTPC FC (Ministry of Communication, Transportation and Construction), who beat Lao Army FC 2-1 in the final.

References

2003 establishments in Laos
2003 domestic association football cups
Football competitions in Laos
Lao Premier League
Prime Minister's Cup